Frederick William Pearce Jago (fl. 1838–1892) was a scholar best known for his work The Ancient Language and the Dialect of Cornwall, originally published 1882 by Netherton and Worth of Truro. He also published a Cornish dictionary in 1887. He settled at Bodmin in 1843 where he practised medicine.

External links

People from Bodmin
Celtic studies scholars
Writers from Cornwall
Cornish language
Cornish-speaking people
English topographers
Year of death missing
Cornish-language writers
Year of birth missing